Tyma may refer to:

 John Tyma (born 1958), American football player
 Karina Tyma (born 2000), Polish squash player
 Tim Tyma (born 1960), American football player